Kristian 'K-Dawg' Callaghan (born 1 July 1993) is a British sport shooter. He competed for England in the 25 metre rapid fire pistol event at the 2014 Commonwealth Games where he won a bronze medal. He finished 4th in the 50 metre pistol event at the 2018 Commonwealth Games.

References

1993 births
Living people
English male sport shooters
Commonwealth Games bronze medallists for England
Shooters at the 2014 Commonwealth Games
Commonwealth Games medallists in shooting
European Games competitors for Great Britain
Shooters at the 2019 European Games
British male sport shooters
Medallists at the 2014 Commonwealth Games